Uhuru (a Swahili word meaning freedom) may refer to:

People
Uhuru Hamiter (born 1973), American football player
Uhuru Kenyatta (born 1961), President of Kenya since 2013

Places
Uhuru (Tanzanian ward), an administrative ward in the Dodoma Urban district of the Dodoma Region
Uhuru Monument, or Uhuru Torch Monument, a landmark monument in Dar es Salaam, Tanzania
Uhuru Park in Nairobi, Kenya
Uhuru Peak, the highest summit on the rim of Kibo volcanic cone at Mount Kilimanjaro

Music
Uhuru (band), a South African music group
Uhuru (album), a 1992 album by Osibisa
Uhuru record label set up in 1971 by Roy Cousins
"Uhuru", track on 2008 album Astrological Straits by Zach Hill
 Black Uhuru, a 1980’s reggae group

Other uses
, a Lake Victoria ferry in East Africa
Uhuru (satellite), the first satellite launched specifically for the purpose of X-ray astronomy
Uhuru (novel), a 1962 novel by American author Robert Ruark
Uhuru Design, a Brooklyn-based design and build sustainable furniture company
Uhuru Mobile, a secure Android-based operating system
Uhuru Torch, a national symbol of Tanzania
Uhuru, a name given to one of the East African Railways EAR 60 class locomotives
Uhuru, a slogan used by the Proud Boys, a far-right neo-fascist group

See also

Uhura, a character in Star Trek
Uluru, also known as Ayers Rock, a landform in Australia
Uhuru Afrika, a 1960 album by American jazz pianist Randy Weston 
Uhuru Movement, a socialist movement led by the African People's Socialist Party
Harambee, another Swahili word which has seen considerable popular use